Ate may be:

Garus language
Arhe language